Erik Wille (born 28 March 1993) is a German former professional footballer who played as a defender.

Career
Wille joined MSV Duisburg for the 2014–15 season. In October 2015, Wille was forced to retire from professional football due to a hip injury.

References

External links
 

1993 births
Living people
Footballers from Frankfurt
German footballers
Association football defenders
MSV Duisburg players
3. Liga players